The Gateway Tour, title sponsored as the OnCore Gateway Tour, is a third-level men's professional golf tour headquartered in Phoenix, Arizona that runs tournaments in Arizona, California, and Florida. The top level of men's professional golf in the United States is the PGA Tour. The second level is the Korn Ferry Tour, which is the official developmental tour run by the PGA Tour. The Gateway Tour and rival ventures such as the Swing Thought Tour are the level below that. The fourth and lowest level of tour golf is the mini-tour circuit.

The Gateway Tour was founded as the Gateway Pro Tour in 2001 by former Arizona State All-American golfer Chris Stutts. The first season had 14 tournaments and paid out US$2.4 million in prize money. By 2006 it had expanded to 59 tournaments with a pay-out of $7.2 million. The prize money is primarily funded by the players' entry fees. A full season of 14 events cost the player around $17,000, not including travel expenses (2004 prices). It is not possible to play in all the tournaments as some of them run concurrently. The tour has also been previously titled as the All-American Gateway Tour and the Grey Goose Gateway Tour.

The West Palm Beach series in Florida originated as the Golden Bear Tour, which the Gateway Tour purchased in March 2005. The regular tournaments are 54-hole events, and the four Series Championships are played over 72 holes. There is also a 72-hole Tour Championship for the top players in all four Series.

The sporting aim of the Tour is to help players to win a place on the Korn Ferry Tour, or to jump directly to the PGA Tour. The tour's board of advisers includes Phil Mickelson and Tom Lehman. In 2006 Gateway Tour players earned 10 PGA Tour and 15 fully exempt Korn Ferry Tour cards. Tour alumni include Sean O'Hair, Notah Begay III, J. B. Holmes, Steve Marino, Kevin Stadler, and Bubba Watson.

Overall money leaders

References

External links

Professional golf tours
Golf in Arizona
Golf in Florida
Sports in Phoenix, Arizona